Oberea adumbrata is a species of longhorn beetle in the tribe Saperdini in the genus Oberea, discovered by Tippman in 1958.

References

A
Beetles described in 1958